This article is about the 2007 season of the Featherstone Rovers.

2007 Season summary

National League Two table

Table

2007 Season players

2007 Signings/Transfers
Gains

Losses

Re-Signings

References

Featherstone Rovers season